James Wilson (born 6 August 1945) is a Scottish retired amateur football full back who played in the Scottish League for Albion Rovers and Queen's Park. He was capped by Scotland at amateur level.

References 

Scottish footballers
Scottish Football League players
Queen's Park F.C. players
Association football fullbacks
Scotland amateur international footballers
Baillieston Juniors F.C. players
1945 births
Place of birth missing (living people)
Albion Rovers F.C. players
Living people